Lee Hong-gi (born March 2, 1990), also known mononymously as Hongki, is a South Korean singer, actor, and media personality. He is best known as the front man of rock band F.T. Island. In 2015, Lee debuted as a solo artist with the releases of his first Korean extended play FM302 and his first Japanese album, AM302. As an actor, Lee started his career by starring in children drama Magic Kid Masuri (2002). He later successfully transitioned to adult role and participated in various television dramas, notably You're Beautiful (2009) and A Korean Odyssey (2017). He started a YouTube career by launching personal channel Honggi Jonggi in April 2022.

Acting career

Before Lee Hong-gi debuted as a singer with the band F.T. Island, he was a child actor, making his acting debut in 2002 with KBS2 TV series Magic Kid Masuri as Masuri's friend Kim Ji-hoon. This children drama gained popularity among elementary school students during its run. He was also featured in EBS children drama Kkangsooni, where he played the character of Eo Soo-bong, and sang for the drama's OST.

In 2008, he was offered the lead role in Master of Study, the Korean adaptation of Japanese drama Dragon Zakura. Master of Study should have aired in the beginning of 2009 but due to preproduction difficulties, the drama was postponed to the beginning of 2010 which led FNC Entertainment to refuse Lee's role because of his busy schedule with the band.

Lee then played Lysander in a Korean musical theatre version of A Midsummer Night's Dream, where he showcased his singing, acting and dancing skills. In 2009, after a five-year break, he made his acting comeback and took the role of the quirky but loveable drummer Jeremy in You're Beautiful. To promote the drama, he also contributed solo tracks to the OST, such as "Promise" and "Still/As Ever." He received a New Star Award at the 2009 SBS Drama Awards for his performance. You're Beautiful recorded modest ratings in South Korea, but it became an international success and with it, Lee's worldwide popularity increased.

In April 2011, Lee starred in the TBS Japanese drama Muscle Girl! opposite Yui Ichikawa. This was followed by a 90-minute Korean-Japanese co-production titled Noriko Goes to Seoul, in which he played a young aspiring singer who meets an older woman (Takashima Reiko) who inspires him through hardships to achieve his dream.

In June 2013, he made his big screen debut in the movie Rockin' on Heaven's Door (Korean title: Passionate Goodbye), with Baek Jin-hee, in which Lee portrayed as a rebellious music star who is sent to work in a hospice.

Lee began filming Bride of the Century with Yang Jin-sung. He went on a four-week rest after he dislocated his shoulder and suffered facial fractures during December 2013. He resumed shooting in January 2014, and the drama aired that February.

Lee also starred in SBS Modern Farmer alongside Park Min-woo, Lee Ha-nui, and others. The drama aired from October 18, 2014 to December 21, 2014, at 20:40 on Saturdays and Sundays.

Music career

F.T. Island

In 2007, Lee debuted in the band F.T. Island as the lead singer. He can also rap and beatbox.

Lee decided to pursue a career in singing after he starred in Kkangsooni, for which he sang a song for the soundtrack. At the end of the drama, he performed the song live on stage. He was 13 years old at that time. Impressed by his powerful vocal ability, a few music agents approached him, not wishing to waste his talent for singing. Then-fledgling label company FNC Music signed Lee and fully trained him to become the lead singer of F.T. Island.

Solo debut
In 2015, Lee announced through social media that he was working on both a Korean and Japanese album, which was released in November and December respectively. The mini Korean album was revealed to be FM302, and the album was released on November 18, 2015, while the Japanese album was revealed to be AM302, and it was released on December 9, 2015. 'FM302' combines the radio terminology frequency modulation (FM) with Lee's birthday which is on March 2, to create the effect of his own radio frequency that resonates his music across the world. The title song "Insensible" is a ballad track and it tells the sad story of a man who is unable to forget his previous love. The music video was published on November 18, 2015. The lead actress of the music video is actress Park Shin-hye. Prior to his official music video release, a showcase was organised. Upon the release of FM302, it topped both Naver's real-time search chart, as well as Hanteo sales chart. The album still retained its position next week, selling more than 19,000 albums within two weeks. Moreover, six days after the release of the album, Lee won first place on SBS MTV's The Show for the first time. The album charted at No. 2 on Gaon Chart's national physical albums ranking, as well as No. 5 on the Gaon Social Chart in the 3rd week of November.

On the other hand, the music video for the lead single of the Japanese album AM302, "モノローグ (Monologue)", was published on November 11, 2015 on F.T. Island's Official Japanese YouTube channel. The Japanese album contained some tracks from the Korean album FM302, but was translated into Japanese. The album is also available in three different sets, namely, the original version, Primadonna version (for fans), and the limited edition DVD version. Upon release, it charted at #4 in the Oricon charts.

Soundtrack appearances
Lee has sung many OSTs for different dramas such as You're Beautiful, Heartstrings and The Heirs.

On May 21, 2015, Dal Shabet official YouTube channel uploaded a video titled Joker in Rock Version. The video was a collaboration with Lee and Subin singing Joker in rock version. It was believed that the two decided on a collaboration when Lee and Subin met on Hello Counselor.

Compositions and lyric-writing
In recent years, Lee has also begun composing music, contributing the songs "Black Chocolate" and "Orange Sky" to F.T. Island's Japanese album Rated FT, as well as the title track "Memory" and the song "Always With You" on F.T. Island's Korean mini-album Thanks To, "Siren" from their album The Mood and title song "Wind" from their album Over 10 Years . He also composed Japanese songs "On My Way", "Just Please" and "Born to be a Rock n Roller".

Personal life

Lee was enrolled in Kyunghee University studying theatre and film.

Lee started his own fashion brand 'Skullhong' in June 2014. He designs accessories, jewelry and various nail products. It was originally based in Seoul, but has since expanded its business to Hong Kong, and Tokyo, Japan.

On September 30, 2019, Lee began his mandatory military service, becoming the first F.T. Island member to enlist.  Lee was discharged on April 18, 2021.

Discography

Albums
 2015: AM302 (Japanese)
 2018: Cheers (Japanese)
 2020: Mixtape (Japanese)

EPs
 2015: FM302 (Korean)
 2018: Do n Do (Korean)
 2021: Drawing (Japanese)

Soundtrack contributions

Filmography

Television series

Film

Variety show

Radio show

Musical theatre

Bibliography

Awards and nominations

References

External links 

 
 
 

1990 births
Living people
People from Seongnam
FNC Entertainment artists
South Korean pop rock singers
South Korean television personalities
South Korean male television actors
21st-century South Korean male actors
South Korean male film actors
South Korean male child actors
South Korean male idols
F.T. Island members
Kyung Hee University alumni
21st-century South Korean singers
South Korean singer-songwriters